Nicola Barker (born 30 March 1966) is an English novelist and short story writer.

She was born in Ely, Cambridgeshire, England. When she was still young her parents left England and settled in South Africa.

Fiction
Typically she writes about damaged or eccentric people in mundane situations, and has a fondness for bleak, isolated settings. Wide Open and Behindlings are set respectively on the Isle of Sheppey and Canvey Island. Together with Darkmans (2007) they form an informal trilogy based around the Thames Gateway. 
Darkmans won the 2008 Hawthornden Prize. Patrick Ness's review in The Guardian described the book as "phenomenally good" despite it being a "838-page epic with little describable plot, taking place over just a few days and set in...Ashford"

Her 2004 novel, Clear, is set in London during David Blaine's Above the Below 44-day fast in London in 2003.

Awards and honours
1993: PEN/Macmillan Silver Pen Award co-winner for Love Your Enemies
1993: David Higham Prize for Fiction winner for Love Your Enemies
1996: John Llewellyn Rhys prize winner for Heading Inland
2000: International Dublin Literary Award winner for Wide Open
2004: Man Booker Prize longlist for Clear: A Transparent Novel
2007: Man Booker Prize shortlist for Darkmans
2012: Man Booker Prize longlist for The Yips
2017: Goldsmiths Prize winner for H(a)ppy

Publications

Novels
 Reversed Forecast (1994)
 Small Holdings (1995)
 Wide Open (1998) 
 Five Miles from Outer Hope (2000)
 Behindlings (2002)
 Clear: A Transparent Novel (2004) 
 Darkmans (2007) 
 Burley Cross Postbox Theft (2010)
 The Yips (2012) 
 In the Approaches (2014)
 The Cauliflower (2016)
 H(a)ppy (2017)
 I Am Sovereign (2019)
 Elmwood (tbc)

Collections of stories
 Love Your Enemies (1993) 
 Heading Inland (1996) 
 The Three Button Trick: Selected Stories (2001)

Short stories
 The Free Hand (1998)
 By Force of Will, Alone (2009)

References

External links

 
 

1966 births
English women novelists
Living people
John Llewellyn Rhys Prize winners
People from Ely, Cambridgeshire
20th-century English novelists
21st-century English novelists
20th-century English women writers
21st-century English women writers
Goldsmiths Prize winners
Magic realism writers